Swami Satyananda may refer to:

Swami Satyananda Giri (1896-1971), Indian monk
Swami Satyananda Saraswati (1923-2009), Indian yoga teacher and guru

See also
Swami Satyananda Puri (disambiguation)